Andregoto Galíndez, of the County of Aragon, was the Queen of Pamplona by marriage to García Sánchez I, prior to being divorced by him before 940. She was the mother of Sancho II of Pamplona.

Andregoto was one of two daughters born to Galindo II Aznárez, Count of Aragon by his second wife, Sancha Garcés of Pamplona, a half-sister of king Sancho I of Pamplona.  Her father's county of Aragon had been brought into the Kingdom of Pamplona realm under Sancho I, and following Galindo's 922 death was held by a count Guntislo, apparently her illegitimate half-brother, Guntislo Galíndez. Her father's other county of Sobrarbe went with Andregoto's half-sister, Toda Galíndez, in marriage with count Bernard I of Ribagorza. Likely sometime in the mid-930s, Andregoto married to Sancho's only son, then ruling Pamplona as García Sánchez I. 

Prior to 940, García divorced Andregoto, presumably due to consanguinity since both were grandchildren of García Jiménez of Pamplona. Together they had a sole son, Sancho II of Pamplona, and she may also have been mother of García's two daughters, whose maternity is unknown or disputed: Toda, who is mentioned in 991 as sister of King Sancho, and Urraca, wife successively of Fernán González of Castile and William II Sánchez of Gascony. 

It has been suggested that Andregoto remarried and had further children, although the details have not been discovered. Endregota, wife of 11th-century nobleman Sancho Macerátiz and mother of his son Sancho Sánchez, calls Queen Andregoto avuncula ('maternal aunt'), probably indicating that Endregota descended from a sister of the queen. Ubierto Arteta suggested a descent from Andregoto's full-sister, Velasquita Galíndez.

Notes

Sources

 
 
 
 

Navarrese royal consorts
Counts of Aragon
10th-century Spanish women
10th-century people from the Kingdom of Pamplona